Zymologa is a moth genus, belonging to the family  Tineidae. It contains only one species, Zymologa mylicopa, which is found in Colombia.

References

Tineidae
Monotypic moth genera
Moths of South America
Tineidae genera
Taxa named by Edward Meyrick